Johny Asadoma (born January 8, 1966, in Denpasar) is a former Indonesian amateur boxer. After his retirement from boxing, Asadoma joined the Indonesia's academy of police, and became a police officer of Indonesia.

Career as a boxer
 Bronze Medalist (flyweight) in Indonesian Golden Gloves Championship 1982, in Denpasar
 Gold Medalist (flyweight) Sea Games 1983, Singapore
 Gold medalist President's Cup 1984, Jakarta
 Los Angeles Olympic Games 1984: lost KO 3 to Héctor López (Mexico) in the first round.

Career as a policeman
 Commander of Indonesian police contingent in United Nations' Peace Keeping Force in Darfur, Sudan (October 2008)

References
  News about Johny Asadoma's Assignment in Sudan and Boxing Career - boxing-indonesia.com
 sports-reference

External links
  National Police to dispatch personnels to Sudan - thejakartapost.com

1966 births
Indonesian Christians
Boxers at the 1984 Summer Olympics
Olympic boxers of Indonesia
Flyweight boxers
Indonesian police officers
Living people
Indonesian male boxers
People from Denpasar
Sportspeople from Bali
Southeast Asian Games medalists in boxing
Southeast Asian Games gold medalists for Indonesia
Competitors at the 1983 Southeast Asian Games